SVET ("light") was a plant cultivation unit on the Kristall module of the Mir space station. It was installed in 1990 and operated until 2001. Brassica rapa was successfully grown there in 1997.

The project was a joint Russian-Bulgarian one, developed at the Space Research and Technology Institute in Sofia.

References

Astrobiology
Mir
Space program of Bulgaria
Space-flown life
Bulgaria–Soviet Union relations